The 1990 Asian Junior Athletics Championships was the third edition of the international athletics competition for Asian under-20 athletes, organised by the Asian Athletics Association. It took place from 13–16 June in Beijing, China. A total of 40 events were contested, 22 for male athletes and 18 for female athletes.

Medal summary

Men

Women

Medal table

Results

Women's 100 metres
The women's 100 metres event at the 1990 Asian Junior Athletics Championships was held in Beijing, China on 13 June.

Medalists

Heats
Wind:Heat 1: +0.7 m/s, Heat 2: +1.2 m/s, Heat 3: +1.2 m/s

Final
Wind: +2.9 m/s

Women's 400 metres
The women's 400 metres event at the 1990 Asian Junior Athletics Championships was held in Beijing, China on 13–14 June.

Medalists

Heats

Final

Women's 4 × 100 metres relay
The women's 4 × 100 metres relay event at the 1990 Asian Junior Athletics Championships was held in Beijing, China on 16 June.

References

Results
Asian Junior Championships 1990. World Junior Athletics History. Retrieved on 2013-10-19.

External links
Asian Athletics official website

Asian Junior Championships
Asian Junior Athletics Championships
International athletics competitions hosted by China
Sports competitions in Beijing
Asian Junior Athletics Championships
Asian Junior Athletics Championships
1990 in youth sport
Athletics in Beijing